The women's shot put competition at the 2002 Asian Games in Busan, South Korea was held on 9 October at the Busan Asiad Main Stadium.

Schedule
All times are Korea Standard Time (UTC+09:00)

Records

Results

References

External links 
Results

Athletics at the 2002 Asian Games
2002